State Highway 69 (SH 69) is an  state highway in the US state of Colorado. SH 69's northern terminus is at U.S. Route 50 (US 50) in Texas Creek, and the southern terminus is at Interstate 25 Business (I-25 Bus.) north of Walsenburg.

Route description

SH 69 starts at a junction with I-25 Bus. just north of Walsenburg. The highway heads northwest over Long Saddle Pass and Promontory Divide Pass to Westcliffe and ends at the Texas Creek junction with US 50 between Cañon City and Salida.

Major intersections

References

External links

069
Transportation in Huerfano County, Colorado
Transportation in Custer County, Colorado
Transportation in Fremont County, Colorado